The 1978 Scottish League Cup final was played on 18 March 1978 and was the final of the 32nd Scottish League Cup competition. It was contested by the Old Firm derby rivals, Rangers and Celtic. Rangers won the match 2–1 after extra time thanks to goals by Davie Cooper and Gordon Smith.

Match details

External links 
 Soccerbase

1978
League Cup Final
Celtic F.C. matches
Rangers F.C. matches
20th century in Glasgow
Old Firm matches